The Piła Airport opened in 1913 in the town of Piła, in the rather sparsely populated part of northern Wielkopolska, Poland. It possesses a former military airport (runway size: 2400.5 x 60 meters) within the city limits, which does not serve any scheduled traffic. It was proposed to use the airport for commercial purposes, and the town authorities sent invitations to airlines asking whether they would be eager to operate on it. However, the interested airlines did not convince the authorities to turn it into a normal commercial airport. That might be due to the demographic limitations—the population in the catchment area is not larger than 1.5 million. In 2006, it was agreed to reopen the airport; however, no change occurred.

References

External links 
Official website

Airports in Poland
Piła County
Buildings and structures in Greater Poland Voivodeship